Battleship is a 1993 Nintendo Entertainment System and Game Gear video game based on the board game of the same name.

Summary
The object is to sink the opponent's entire fleet without them sinking the player's fleet first. In this updated version, both the player and the computer get extra firepower from military aircraft and support weapons. There are even scenarios that start a player off in a pre-played game that he must resume (and overcome a bleak scenario). This video game was mentioned in an old issue of Nintendo Power. There also have been other versions of Battleship, including Battleships for Amiga, Atari ST, Commodore 64 and ZX Spectrum, Battleship for CD-i, Battleship for Game Boy and Game Boy Color, and others for PC and mobile phones. There was a sequel on the Super NES and Sega Genesis,  Super Battleship.

Gameplay

Cannons are the most notable weapons of combatant ships. The user can attack an enemy vessel by aiming the sight and pushing the button.

Torpedoes are another type of ammunition. They are explosive and powerful. However, they are slower than the cannons.

Depth Charges are weapons used against submarines and underwater mines. The user must first adjust at what depth the charges will detonate before launching them.

Missiles are the most powerful among the weapons. Though a ship could only have up to two of them, they can sink a ship of any size in only one blow.

All the weapons (except from the one which shoots one square) can be only used one time.

Levels

The game has eight levels with five battles each. So, the player must win 40 battles to clear the game. After winning a battle, a password will be provided. New weapons are added each level.

Ships
Submarine, Permit-class (1 square)
Frigate, Knox-class (2 squares)
Destroyer, Coontz-class (3 squares)
Cruiser, Albany-class (4 squares)
Battleship, Iowa-class (5 squares)
Carrier, Nimitz-class (4x2 squares)

References

External links

1993 video games
Naval video games
Top-down video games
Turn-based strategy video games
Nintendo Entertainment System games
Game Gear games
Video games based on board games
Video games scored by Mark Knight
Video games developed in the United Kingdom
Mindscape games